Lasioglossum olympiae is a species of sweat bee in the family Halictidae.

References

Further reading

 
 
 

olympiae
Insects described in 1898